Grae Cleugh (born 1968) is a British playwright.

Early life and education
Grae Cleugh was born Graeme John Cleugh in Glasgow in 1968, studied law in Edinburgh, and drama at RSAMD in Glasgow. He took extended leave of his acting studies to focus on his writing and his debut work, F***ing Games and won an Olivier Award for most promising new playwright at the Royal Court in 2002.

Works

Theatre

Other work

Awards
Eight, Nine, Ten, Out, Short-listed for the 1998 Soho Theatre's Westminster Prize

F***ing Games, 2002 Olivier Award for most promising playwright.

Acting Credits
2003/2004, IZ, Silver Tongue Theatre

2006/2007, Shiver, Silver Tongue Theatre

2005/2006, Bella and the Beautiful Knight, Silver Tongue Theatre

2007, Man across the way, Silver Tongue Theatre

References 

1968 births
Living people
Writers from Glasgow